Brian Mitchell is well known in music industry circles and beyond for working with some of music's most respected artists. He has worked with Levon Helm & The Midnight Ramble Band, Bob Dylan, BB King, Al Green, Dolly Parton,  Buster Poindexter, and Allen Toussaint.  He also records and performs his own original music. Mitchell has appeared on 5 Grammy Award-winning recordings, 3 with Levon Helm, and one each with BB King and with Les Paul. In 2015 Brian was inducted into the New York Blues Hall Of Fame. His versatility on piano, Hammond B-3 organ, accordion, various vintage keyboards and harmonica, plus his distinct vocal stylings, have firmly established him as one of New York City's most sought after musicians.

A native New Yorker, Mitchell is a mainstay in Manhattan's competitive live music scene. Known for kicking out high-energy performances, Mitchell's own original music features a unique blend of gutbucket blues, funky New Orleans style R& B, quirky Latin rhythms, and occasional visits into outer space.

Brian is currently performing throughout the country with The Weight, former members of The Band & The Levon Helm Midnight Ramble celebrating the music of The Band. He also performs much of his original music with "The Brian Mitchell Band" and as well with his accordion power trio "Fatboy Kanootch" with Clark Gayton on tuba. He also performs funky electronica music with "House OF Diablo" featuring Shawn Pelton on drums and electronic percussion at various nightclubs and performance spaces around New York City.

Brian's work as a composer has been featured in TV, film, and theatre. His original music with “House Of Diablo” was featured in the Robert Altman movie “Tanner On Tanner”. His blues piano stylings were used in Bill Sims music for August Wilson's Broadway play “8 Pianos”.  Brian also cowrote the music for the AMC TV series "Hell On Wheels" with Marc Copely and James Dolan. And recently the song “Step Away” written by Brian and Christine Santelli was included on Bettye LaVette's Grammy nominated CD “Worthy”.

Brian has made frequent TV appearances including performances on “The Late Show with David Letterman”, “Late Night with Conan O’Brien”, and "The Tonight Show" appearing with artists such as Dolly Parton, Dwight Yoakam, Rosanne Cash. He has made an appearance on the soap opera “One Life To Live” as a mysterious piano man in the local hotel bar. Brian's accordion can be heard throughout Bob Dylan's version of the Dean Martin chestnut “Return To Me" on the HBO series "The Sopranos". Other special collaborations include accompanying actor Christopher Walken on accordion in the movie “Search and Destroy” and playing piano with Amy Helm in the Vera Farmiga directed film "Higher Ground".

Brian performed with Levon Helm in the Grammy award-winning DVD "Live At The Ryman" along with Robert Plant, Steve Earle, Emmylou Harris, Buddy Miller, and Sheryl Crow. On the PBS show "The Love For Levon Concert" he can be seen performing with Roger Waters, Gregg Allman & Warren Haynes, John Mayer, John Hiatt, John Prine, Mavis Staples, Lucinda Williams, Jakob Dylan, Dierks Bentley, Eric Church, and My Morning Jacket. On April 22, 2017 Brian performed on PBS once again with The Weight Band on "Live At The Infinity" In November Brian appeared at The Woodland Festival in Namsos, Norway as the featured accordionist. In December 2017 Brian will appear at the 37th annual John Lennon Tribute at The Symphony Space performing the music of The Beatles "Sergeant Peppers Lonely Hearts Club Band with Fatboy Kanootch.

His unique approach to performing and recording in the studio was the subject of a feature article in Keyboard Magazine. Subsequently, Brian has written various articles about his approach to performance as well as doing an interview with Allen Toussaint.

Recently, Mitchell released World Gone Mad as a member of The Weight Band. The project features contributions from Levon Helm, Jackie Greene and Stan Szelest.

References

External links 

 Bio on Levon Helm's website
  "The Saint of New Orleans Piano" by Brian Mitchell. Interview of musician Allen Toussaint in Keyboard Magazine, November 2006.

Living people
American keyboardists
American accordionists
21st-century accordionists
Year of birth missing (living people)